Faughart (also written Fochart) is an early Christian ruins and shrine site just north of Dundalk, County Louth, Ireland. As a popular site for modern pilgrimages, it was the birthplace of St Brigid in 451 AD, and one of her relics is held in a church in nearby Kilcurry. Edward Bruce, a younger brother of Robert the Bruce, is buried in the graveyard on the hill above the shrine. Bruce, who had taken the title King of Ireland, was defeated and killed at the Battle of Faughart in 1318. Landmarks include St Brigid's stone and pillar, her shrine and well, and modern religious sites devoted to the saint that attract thousands of pilgrims and tourists, providing a massive boost to the local economy. Ruins include an Iron Age fort, a Norman motte-and-bailey castle, and a medieval church.

Situated 3 km north of Dundalk and 6 km south of Forkill, and standing at the southern end of the Gap of the North/Moyry Pass, Faughart held huge strategic importance for many centuries and was the scene of many battles; one such legendary battle was fought by Cú Chulainn in the Táin.

Battles

248 AD
A battle was fought at Faughart by Cormac Ulfada, High King of Ireland, against Storno (Starno), king of Lochlin.

732 AD
The date of 732, or alternatively 735, is given for the Battle of Fochart between Áed Allán, king of Ireland, and Áed Róin, king of Ulaid. Áed Róin and Conchad mac Cúanach of Uí Echach Cobo were slain, with Áed Róin being decapitated on the Cloch an Commaigh (Stone of Decapitation) located near the door of the old church of Faughart. This conflict arose as a result of a request by Bishop Congus. The Annals of the Four Masters give the story as follows under the year 732:

An Irish proverb arose from this incident: Torad penne Congusa (‘the fruit of Congus’s pen’), i.e. the downfall of the Ulaid resulted from the letter of Congus.

1318 AD
The Battle of Faughart was fought on 14 October 1318 between a Hiberno-Norman force led by John de Bermingham, 1st Earl of Louth, and Edmund Butler, Earl of Carrick and a Scots-Irish army commanded by Edward Bruce, the brother of Robert Bruce, King of Scots, who had been hailed as King of Ireland by certain Irish chiefs.

References

Sources
Foster, R.F. The Oxford Illustrated History of Ireland. Oxford University Press, 2001, p. 83 online.
 Lehane, Brendan. The Companion Guide to Ireland. Companion Guides, 2001, p. 458 online.
Lewis, Samuel. A Topographical Dictionary of Ireland, vol 2. London 1837. Full text downloadable.
Saint Brigid’s Shrine & Well Faughart, with map

County Louth